Henri Auguste Calixte César Serrur  (1794–1865, signed Henry Auguste or Calixte) was a French painter.
A student of  Jean-Baptiste Regnault, he specialised on history paintings and battle scenes. He painted the portraits of the nine Avignon Popes kept at the papal palais in Avignon.

References

E. A. Fleischmann, Neues allgemeines Künstler-Lexicon vol.  16 (1846), p. 290.
Francis Petit  (ed.), Catalogue des Tableaux, Esquisses, Études & Croquis laissés par Serrur, Peintre d'Histoire (1866) (bnf.fr).

External links

culture.gouv.fr
artnet.com

19th-century French painters
1794 births
1865 deaths